The Making of Bread Act 1757 (32 Geo. II c. 29) was an Act of the Parliament of Great Britain, which aimed to protect the making of bread and punish those that adulterated it, for the purposes of protecting public health. It was introduced after a report accused bakers of using alum, chalk and powdered bones to keep bread white.

Background

In England, the regulation of bread was often a priority for the English – and later British – governments since at least the thirteenth century. Prior to the mid-eighteenth century, selling underweight bread was a punishable offence, and thus sometimes stones were used to increase the weight of bread to avoid the regulation. 

As white bread became preferable, so did the adding of alum. The concept that a baker could add chalk or bone triggered a riot in Manchester. Making white bread meant discarding part of the edible wholegrain, and which was discouraged during times of food shortage. Bakers in 1735, complained about the poor quality of flour they received. Traditionally an exporter of wheat, after 1750, England began importing it, with the consequence of rising prices of bread.

The originating bill was introduced after a report accused bakers of using alum lime, chalk and powdered bones to keep bread white, and was passed and published in 1757.

The Act
The Act aimed to protect the making of bread and punish those that adulterated it. It generally related to London, with the aim of changing people's behaviour in bread consumption. In order to persuade bakers to make and sell household bread, the Act abolished the traditional White and Wheaten grades.

Effects
The Act had little effect on eating habits in London, with respect to bread, and people continued to prefer the old Wheaten bread to the new household type.

See also
Making of Bread, etc. Act 1800
Assize of Bread and Ale

References

Bibliography

External links 

Acts of the Parliament of Great Britain
1750s in Great Britain
Food law